"Canon Alberic's Scrap-Book" is a horror story by British writer M. R. James, which was written in 1894 and published the following year in the National Review. It was included in his first short story collection, Ghost Stories of an Antiquary of 1904.

Plot summary
The story has a detailed and realistic setting in the tiny decaying cathedral city of Saint-Bertrand-de-Comminges, at the foot of the Pyrenees in southern France. An English tourist spends a day photographing the interior of the eponymous cathedral and is encouraged by the sacristan to buy an unusual manuscript. This, he concludes, had been created long ago by Canon Albéric de Mauléon (an invented character, said to be a collateral descendant of the real 16th-century bishop Jean de Mauléon), who had cut up volumes in the old cathedral library. A disturbing illustration of King Solomon and a demon in the back of the book is a key to the story's suspenseful arc.

Adaptations

The story has inspired a musical composition by Kaikhosru Shapurji Sorabji, St. Bertrand de Comminges: "He was laughing in the tower", first performed in 1985 by Yonty Solomon.

In 2020, the story was adapted into a full-cast audio drama for the second season of Shadows at the Door: The Podcast.

References

External links 

 

 Full text of "Canon Alberic's Scrap-Book"
 Helen Grant, "'He was laughing in the church': A Visit to St Bertrand de Comminges" in Ghosts & Scholars Newsletter no. 7 (2005).
 Works by Kaikhosru Shapurji Sorabji

1894 short stories
Horror short stories
Church buildings in fiction
Demons in written fiction
Short stories by M. R. James
Works originally published in National Review (London)